Island Harbour may refer to:

Island Harbour, Anguilla, a district in Anguilla
Island Harbour (Anguilla House of Assembly Constituency), a constituency in Anguilla
Island Harbour, Newfoundland and Labrador, a village in Canada
Island Harbour Marina, a marina in the United Kingdom
Island Harbourview, a housing development in Hong Kong
Bluff Harbour, a harbour in New Zealand